Helen Baker may refer to:

 Helen Baker (tennis), American tennis player
 Helen Baker (author) (born 1948), English author